Anthem Lights is an American Christian group originating from Los Angeles. The group has released one EP under their former name, Yellow Cavalier and six albums under their current name.  The group's debut album was released May 10, 2011 by Reunion Records.

Beginnings

Anthem Lights began as a solo project for vocalist Chad Graham in the fall of 2007. Both he and Alan Powell were living in Los Angeles, writing music for Graham's solo project. As the final vocal work was being installed, Powell and Graham came to a realization that the songs being written would be more appropriate performed as a group. It was then that Powell and Graham decided to alert their contacts at Liberty University in an effort to recruit members for what is now a singing group. Powell and Graham's contacts came to a consensus that Kyle Kupecky and Caleb Grimm would be the best candidates for the project. After receiving notifications by e-mail, Graham flew from Los Angeles to meet with Kupecky and Grimm, who gladly accepted membership. Powell joined the group at the last minute.

The original name of the group was Yellow Cavalier. The group recorded one self-titled EP under this name in 2009. The EP was released independently on May 26, 2009. The group changed their name to Anthem Lights before any other projects were released.

Name change 

The group's name changed to Anthem Lights sometime after their independent release as Yellow Cavalier. Months later, the group signed to Reunion Records. Vocalist Kyle Kupecky comments about the meaning behind the name:

On February 1, 2011, Anthem Lights released the Anthem Lights EP. Although it was the second EP by the group, it was the first on Reunion Records and the first under their current name. The EP received very positive reviews and chart success as "Can't Shut Up," the first track from the EP, peaked at No. 42 on Billboards Christian Songs chart and at No. 27 on the CHR radio charts. The three-track EP is being deemed a sampler as all of the tracks on it will be featured on their debut album, which is also self-titled. The album was released May 10, 2011. The cover art is similar to the EP in that it is simply the official band photo under the official band logo. The only difference is the background color.

Anthem Lights performed on the Listen to the Sound Tour. The tour was headlined by Building 429, since the tour carried the same name as their latest album, and it featured Revive. Anthem Lights performed on the 2011 Rock & Worship Roadshow tour along with MercyMe, Jars of Clay, and The Afters.

The album You Have My Heart was released on February 4, 2014. The album Escape was released on October 14, 2014.

On February 1, 2016, former singer-guitarist-pianist Alan Powell left the band to pursue his growing career in acting.

On April 7, 2017, they released their fourth album, Hymns. On October 12, 2017, they released their fifth album, Painted Skies. This is their first album with Spencer Kane, a solo Christian artist formerly of the TV Series iShine Knect of TBN Studios and a 6 time award winner and Billboard charting indie artist.

On February 2, 2018, the band released a compilation album called Better Together: The Mixtape, which features an acoustic version of their song Better Together, along with solo music from each of the members, On March 16, 2018, they released their sixth album Hymns Vol. II.

Band membersCurrent members Chad Graham – vocals
 Caleb Grimm – vocals
 Spencer Kane – vocals
 Joey Stamper – vocals, piano, guitar, drumsFormer members'
 Kyle Kupecky – vocals
 Alan Powell – vocals, guitar, piano

Discography

Studio albums

Studio EPs

Singles

Compilation appearances

References

2007 establishments in Tennessee
American Christian musical groups
Christian pop groups
Reunion Records artists
Musical groups established in 2007
Musical groups from Nashville, Tennessee